Lamont Peterson (born January 24, 1984) is an American former professional boxer who competed from 2004 to 2019. He held world championships in two weight classes, including the IBF light welterweight title between 2011 and 2015, and the WBA (Regular) welterweight title in 2017.

Early life
Lamont Peterson and his younger brother Anthony Peterson have been regularly featured on ESPN boxing telecasts and their story has been frequently discussed on the show. The Petersons were left without parents at an early age, with their father in prison and their mother suffering personal issues. The brothers were reportedly homeless on the streets of Washington, DC for several years. While homeless at age 10, they were noticed by Barry Hunter, a boxing coach. Over time, Hunter developed their boxing skills while mentoring them and both brothers morphed into amateur boxing stars. They have said that their toughest bout were against a pair of brothers from Virginia, Ordano and Orazio Robinson

Amateur career
2001 National Golden Gloves Lightweight Champion.

He became 141 lbs US champion in 2003. He holds wins over Rock Allen in 2003, who beat him twice 2004 in the Olympic box-offs, Mike Alvarado and Andre Dirrell, as well as 2003 amateur world champion Willy Blain (in 2003).

Professional career

Light welterweight

Early years
Lamont Peterson made his professional debut on September 25, 2004, on the undercard of Glenn Johnson vs. Roy Jones Jr. at the FedEx Forum in Memphis, Tennessee. Peterson's brother Anthony also made his debut on the same card, winning via 1st-round knockout. Peterson fought 18 year old Nicholas Dean, who at the time had only one fight on his record, which was a loss. Peterson stopped Dean after just 22 seconds into his debut. Peterson went on to fight a further 3 times in 2004, remaining undefeated. In 2005, Peterson won all his 11 bouts, with 5 coming via stoppage. At this time, Peterson had racked up 15 wins, with 7 inside the distance and no losses. On February 17, 2006, Peterson saw himself fighting for the Vacant WBC United States light welterweight title at the FedEx Forum against Jose Leo Moreno (12-1, 10 KOs). The fight took place on a Friday night live on ESPN2. Peterson was taken the 10 round distance for a second time winning the vacant title. Two judges scored the fight 100-90, whilst the third had it 99-91, all in favour of Peterson. He never made a defence of the title.

On April 28, Peterson took on his biggest challenge, a fight against Mario Ramos (16-2-1, 3 KOs). Ramos was coming off a wide 12 round unanimous decision loss against top contender Demetrius Hopkins a month earlier. Peterson won the fight via unanimous decision after 10 rounds. Two judges scored the fight clear for Peterson, whilst the third judge awarded Ramos with three rounds. After four wins, Peterson received another title opportunity, this time the vacant WBO NABO super lightweight title against Frankie Santos. Peterson dominated the opening six rounds of the fight. Santos failed to get up off his stool for the start of round 7, retiring on his stool, giving Peterson the win and the title. In November 2007, Peterson fought his first fight outside of the United States, knocking out Ecuadorian boxer Humberto Toledo (31-4-2, 18 KOs) in round 1. The fight took place at the Casablanca Casino in Providenciales International Airport on the Turks And Caicos Islands. Pearson dropped Toledo to a quick knee with combinations to the head and body. Toledo took the mandatory eight-count. He would be knocked down again, this time with a left to the body. An unsteady Toledo made it to his feet as the referee approached the ten count. The fight was stopped. On November 1, 2008, Peterson challenged fringe contender Lanardo Tyner (19-1, 11 KOs) for the Interim NABF title. The fight took place at the Mandalay Bay Hotel & Casino In Paradise, Nevada. Peterson was docked a point for repeated low blows in round 4, but did enough to secure a wide decision win. The three judges' scored the fight 99-90, 99-87 and 98-91 in favour of Peterson.

Peterson vs. Bradley
In April 2009, Peterson defeated French boxer Willy Blain for the vacant WBO Interim title, making him mandatory to full titleholder and The Ring No. 1 light welterweight Timothy Bradley (24-0, 11 KOs). The fight took place at Agua Caliente Casino in Rancho Mirage, California, on December 12, 2009. Bradley dropped Peterson with an overhand right in the third round. However, Peterson got up and landed hard left hooks to the body. Peterson cut under the left eye from an accidental headbutt in round 12. After 12 rounds, the judges scored the fight 120-107, 119-108 and 118-110 in favour of Bradley, retaining his title and handing Peterson his first professional loss. The bout was televised as a main event on Showtime Championship Boxing. After the bout, Peterson told Showtime, "My game plan was to win the first round, but in the middle of the first round, I got hit real hard by a couple of right hands. It really bothered me. I lost the round, I fell behind, I got reckless. I couldn't make it up. I gave it all I had. He's a great champion."

Following his first loss, Peterson returned to the ring on April 10, 2010, at the Hard Rock Hotel and Casino in Paradise, Nevada, against 32 year old boxer Damian Fuller at 143 pound catchweight. Peterson won the fight via 7th-round TKO.

Peterson vs. Ortiz
On October 12, 2010, it was reported by LA Times that Peterson would fight on the undercard of Amir Khan vs. Marcos Maidana, against The Ring No. 9 light welterweight Victor Ortiz (28-2-1, 22 KOs) on December 11 at the Mandalay Bay Resort & Casino in Las Vegas. Ortiz started the fight strong by knocking Peterson down twice in the third round, but many felt Peterson took the middle and late rounds of the fight, doing enough to earn the decision. The fight was officially declared a majority draw. One judge scored the fight 95-93 in favour of Peterson, however the remaining judges scored the fight 94-94. In the post-fight, Ortiz said, "I thought I pulled it off. He didn't even hit that hard." When the fight was over, Ortiz jumped on the top ropes and began celebrating. Ortiz landed 96 of 457 punches thrown (21%), while Peterson was more accurate, landing a total of 111 of 331 shots (33%). Many observers believed Ortiz had won the fight. ESPN's Dan Rafael and HBO's unofficial scorer, scored the bout 97-91 for Ortiz.

Peterson vs. Khan

In September 2011, it was announced that Amir Khan would defend his WBA and IBF light-welterweight titles in Washington DC on 10 December against Peterson at the Convention Center. In front of a near sell out crowd of 8,647, Peterson defeated Khan for the by split decision in a very controversial affair. Khan was docked 2 points in rounds 7 and 12 by the referee Joe Cooper for pushing, although illegal pushing is not usually met with such harsh consequences, the HBO team picked up on this. Peterson was dropped to the canvas twice, although the first time was counted as a slip instead of a legitimate knockdown. Both fighters boxed well and two judges scored it 113–112 to Peterson, with the other 115–110 to Khan (originally announced as 114–111 to Khan). Some observers felt it was a hometown robbery as Peterson is from Washington DC, while many felt that Khan wasn't treated fairly. Khan landed 238 punches out of 757 thrown (31%) and Peterson connected on 226 of 573 blows (39%).   (
ESPN's Dan Rafael score the fight 114-111 in favour of Khan. HBO's unofficial scorer, Harold Lederman, scored it 113-112, also for Khan. After the fight Khan said, "It was like I was against two people, the referee and Lamont himself. I was the cleaner fighter; he was so wild. The referee wasn't giving me a chance. I heard the referee give me a warning [for pushing], but there was nothing I could do. He kept coming in with his head. There hasn't been [HBO] boxing in D.C. for the last [18] years because this is what happens." Khan earned a base purse of  $1.1 million, while Peterson earned a career-high $650,000 purse.

A rematch was due to take place on 19 May. It was later found that Peterson had tested positive for PEDs and was stripped of the WBA title. He admitted to the use of steroids shortly after. Khan was then reinstated as the WBA champion.

Peterson vs. Holt
On December 20, 2012, it was reported that Peterson would fight Timothy Bradley (29-0, 12 KO's) in a rematch, which would take place on March 30, 2013. The issue with the fight being made was due to Peterson's title defence against Kendall Holt which was due to take place in early 2013. In December, Holt's promoter Gary Shaw won the purse bid with an off offer of $50,000. This meant Peterson, as the titleholder would earn $37,500, while Holt would earn $12,500. Shaw told ESPN, although he won the bid, he still worked closely with Peterson's manager Barry Hunter to organise the fight. On January 2, 2013, it was announced that Peterson would mark his first fight in 14 months defending his IBF title at the Armory in Washington D.C. against Holt (28-5, 16 KOs) on February 22. Hunter stated that both fighters would earn more than their announced purses for the fight. The fight aired live on ESPN Friday Night Fights.

Peterson overcame a sluggish start, floored Holt two times, and forced a stoppage in round 8 to successfully defend his IBF title in front of his home crowd. Peterson sealed the win in the eighth when a barrage with Holt against the ropes caused referee Tony Weeks to step in and end it. Holt opened the fourth round looking to step up the pace, but seemed to tire by the midway point and the champion took advantage. A right hand to the side of the head sent Holt down to all fours in the final minute of the round. He remained down on a knee before getting to his feet at the count of eight. Peterson controlled the action from then on. A series of punches from Peterson late in round 6 caused Holt to take a knee for another eight count. Holt admitted he struggled to make the 140 pound limit and considered a move to welterweight.

Peterson vs. Matthysse
On March 23, 2013 Golden Boy Promotions announced that interim WBC light welterweight champion Lucas Matthysse (33-2, 31 KOs) would meet Peterson at Boardwalk Hall in Atlantic City on May 18, in the main event, live on Showtime. Matthysse was waiting to fight full WBC titleholder Danny Garcia, who at the time, had a defence scheduled against Zab Judah. Richard Schaefer, of Golden Boy, had hoped the winner of the two fights would eventually meet in the fall 2013. Matthysse, whose two losses came in his two opponents' hometowns, did not want the fight to take place in Washington D.C., home of Peterson. Matthysse initially wanted the fight to take place in Southern California, however, a deal was reached for the fight to take place in New Jersey. The fight was fought at a 141-pound catch weight which meant no titles were at stake. Matthysse was expected to arrive in New York on May 14, but instead arrived two days later due to an alleged robbery in which his passport was "badly defaced and rendered unusable." Reports indicated it was someone inside of Matthysse's camp hoping to prevent the Argentinian from being able to make the fight. Matthysse and promoters were able to shorten the normally lengthy process of obtaining a new passport to a few days.

A crowd of 4,215 was announced at the Hall, which saw Peterson lose via TKO in round 3. Peterson was knocked down once in round 2 and two more times in round 3. This was counted as successful title defence by Matthysse by the WBC although the title was not on the line for Peterson for being over the light welterweight limit. Matthysse would have been stripped had he lost the fight. In the post fight, Peterson said, "I feel OK. I'm upset that I lost, but I feel good. He hit me with a good shot and I guess just finished the job. I felt as thought I could have fought through it, but the referee did the right thing." Peterson boxed effectively in the opening round and looked to keep Matthysse out of range. In the second round, however, the Argentinian had closed the distance and was able to land. A left hook to the forehead sent Peterson off balance and down in the final minute of the second round. In the third round, a left hook sent Peterson down hard in the center of the ring. He stumbled and struggled to get to his feet, but was able to beat the count and was allowed to continue. Matthysse came forward and threw a combination and again Peterson stumbled backward and down. At that, veteran referee Steve Smoger waved an end to the bout, giving Peterson his first stoppage defeat. For the fight, Matthysse earned a career-high $700,000 purse. Peterson earned $800,000, also a career-high.

Peterson vs. Jean
On November 19, 2013, Golden Boy announced a deal was in place for Peterson to make a defence in his home town against undefeated contender Dierry Jean (25-0, 17 KOs). On December 16, an official press release confirmed the fight would take place at the D.C. Armory on January 25, 2014. In a statement, Peterson said, "This is the perfect way for me to kick off 2014, with a great fight against a tough opponent in my hometown. Fights like these bring out the best in me and I'm going to give my fans a performance to remember." A fight between Jermell Charlo and Gabriel Rosado was announced as a co-feature, with Peteron-Jean scheduled to headline the Showtime card.

In front of a hometown of 5,668, Peterson won the fight by unanimous decision, handing Jean his first career loss, with the judges scores of 118-111, 116-112 and 115-113. Jean started the fight off more patient than Peterson. Midway through the fight Peterson became the aggressor and a few rounds later, started to outwork and outland Jean using his speed and combinations. After the fight, speaking about the Matthysse loss, Peterson said, "Everybody try to make a big deal out of one loss. But if the best fight the best, sometimes it's going to be a knockout. I always prepare myself to win, but I know you can lose. My whole life it's never been easy, so why would it be easy now?" According to CompuBox stats, Peterson landed 230 of 622 punches thrown (37%), while Jean landed on 123 of his 556 total thrown (22%). Former world champion Paulie Malignaggi, who was working as an analyst for Showtime praised Peterson, stating he still has a huge claim at light welterweight.

Peterson vs. García
On January 14, 2015, NBC announced a partnership with Premier Boxing Champions to air premium fights on network television. It was announced that Danny García and Lamont Peterson would fight April 11, 2015, on NBC primetime. The fight was at the Barclays Center in Brooklyn, New York. The highly anticipated bout between García and Peterson took place at a 143-pound catch weight and was a non-title bout. Both fighters had something to prove as García was coming off an extremely tough fight with Mauricio Herrera and Peterson was still reeling from a knockout loss to Lucas Matthysse in 2013. The fight was held at a catchweight of 143 pounds, with neither boxers titles at stake.

A crowd of 12,300 turned up at the Barclays Center. In the early rounds Peterson was very defensive and attempted to frustrate García with his awkward style. García was the busier fighter the first four or five rounds throwing and landing more punches although having trouble landing clean punches on Peterson. Peterson's size and athleticism allowed him to stay in the fight even in the face of waves of serious García body blows. Peterson looked strong going into rounds 10, 11, 12. García maintained a steady attack in the last three rounds of the fight while Peterson began coming forward and throwing everything he had. Despite a very strong showing by Peterson, García was awarded a majority decision by scores of 114-114, 115-113, 115-113. For the fight, Garcia earned $1.5 million compared to Peterson, who earned a $1.2 million purse. CompuBox stats showed that both fighters stayed busy, with Garcia landing 173 of 589 punches (29%), with Peterson more accurate, landing 170 of his 494 thrown (34%).

Welterweight

Peterson vs. Diaz
On October 17, 2015, Peterson fought at the EagleBank Arena in Fairfax, Virginia, against undefeated welterweight prospect and 2008 Olympic gold medalist Félix Díaz (17-0, 8 KOs) in a scheduled 12 round fight. Peterson won a close 12 round majority decision over Diaz. The final judges’ scores were 114-114, 117-111 and 116-112. Peterson was effective with his body punching in most round, but gave away a lot of the rounds to Diaz by not throwing enough punches, and getting hit on the inside. Some observers had Diaz the winner, with ESPN scoring it 116-112 for Diaz. Peterson voiced his opinion in believing he won the fight in the post fight interview, "I started out strong and faded in the middle rounds because I started to cramp, and it lasted for the rest of the fight, but I knew I had done enough to win the fight."

Peterson vs. Avanesyan
In December 2016, early reports suggested there was a fight in the works, for David Avanesyan to defend the interim championship against Peterson. A venue in the United States was being discussed for February 2017. On January 11, 2017, a spokesperson for Avanesyan announced the fight would take place on February 18 at the Cintas Center in Cincinnati, Ohio, on the undercard of Adrien Broner vs. Adrian Granados on Showtime. Peterson became a two-weight division champion after defeating Avanesyan via a 12-round unanimous decision. The fight was described as 'highly competitive and entertaining' by ESPN. Two judges scored it 116-112 and the third had it closer at 115-113, all in favor of Peterson. Peterson earned a purse of $250,000 whilst Avanesyan had a purse of $75,000 and winning the fight put Peterson in position to fight the winner of Keith Thurman and Danny Garcia.

Peterson vs. Spence Jr.
On October 3, 2017, Peterson wrote to the WBA, officially vacating the WBA 'Regular' title. This was believed to be done as part of Peterson challenging IBF welterweight champion Errol Spence Jr. (22-0, 19 KOs) later in the year. On October 13, Boxing Scene reported that terms would be finalised in a week which would see Spence make his first defence on January 13, 2018, against Peterson. Spence, was last in action when he dethroned British boxer Kell Brook in May 2017. On November 5, it was reported the fight was confirmed to take place at the Barclays Center in Brooklyn on January 20, 2018.

On fight night, in front of 12,107, Spence broke Peterson down mentally and physically eventually forcing Peterson's trainer Barry Hunter to stop the fight a second into round 8. Peterson was dropped in round 5 from a left hand by Spence. Peterson beat the count and looked unsteady, surviving the round. Peterson took a lot of punishment, but managed to fire back some offence of his own before the round ended. Peterson's face looked swollen and his eyes were puffy from Spence's hard shots. Spence also worked the body from the opening bell. After round 6, Peterson knew he was behind on the scorecards and indicated to his trainer, who said he would give him a few more rounds. In the post-fight interviews, Spence said, "I want to thank Lamont. A lot guys turned down the fight, and he took like a real warrior, and I commend him for that. My coach [Derrick James] came with a great game plan, and I just followed through with it. Keep my range, keep my composure." Spence admitted he would need to work on his defence a little. When interviewer Jim Gray asked Hunter about the stoppage, he replied, "It was really hard [to stop the fight], but if you know Lamont, you know he was not going to give up. So I had to stop it. At the end of the day this is my son right here. And there's nothing more valuable than his well being. If it comes to him or winning, I pick him. I care about him." At the time of stoppage, all three judges had their scorecards at 70-62 for Spence.

According to CompuBox stats, Spence landed 161 of 526 punches thrown (31%), and Peterson landed only 45 of his 158 thrown (28%). For the fight, Spence had an official purse of $1.2 million and Peterson's purse was $600,000.

Peterson vs. Lipinets 
On 24 March 2019, Peterson faced Sergey Lipinets. Things went downhill for Peterson in the seventh, after Lipinets caught him with a clean right hand that had him on wobbly legs for the rest of the round. Peterson tried his best, but never fully recovered from the blow. Lipinets ended the fight by dropping Peterson in the tenth round, after which his corner immediately threw in the towel.

After the fight Peterson announced his retirement.

Professional boxing record

See also
List of light-welterweight boxing champions
List of welterweight boxing champions

References

External links
 
 Lamont Peterson profile at Premier Boxing Champions
Lamont Peterson - Profile, News Archive & Current Rankings at Box.Live

Living people
American male boxers
African-American boxers
Boxers from Washington, D.C.
American sportspeople in doping cases
Doping cases in boxing
National Golden Gloves champions
Winners of the United States Championship for amateur boxers
Light-welterweight boxers
Welterweight boxers
World light-welterweight boxing champions
World welterweight boxing champions
World Boxing Association champions
International Boxing Federation champions
1984 births
21st-century African-American sportspeople
20th-century African-American people